Kapardin I was Shilahara ruler of North Konkan branch from c. 800 CE – 825 CE.

He was the first known Shilahara king of North Konkan, was placed in charge of the country by the Rashtrakuta  king Govinda III. Since then North Konkan  came to be known as Kapardi-dvipa or Kavadi-dvipa. The capital of this branch was Puri, after which the country was called Puri-Konkan . Their capital seems to have been Puri and their places of note were Hamjaman probably Sanjan in Dahanu, Thane  (Shristhanak), Sopara (Shurparak), Chaul (Chemuli), Lonad (Lavanatata) and than. As the Yadavas call themselves lords of the excellent city of Dvaravatipura or Dwarka and the Kadambas call themselves lords of the excellent city of Banavasipura or Banavasi, so the Shilaharas call themselves lords of the excellent city of Tagarapura or Tagar. This title would furnish a clue to the origin of the Shilaharas it unfortunately, the site of Tagar was not uncertain. From numerous references and grants the Thane Shilaharas seem to have been worshippers of Shiva. (Dept. Gazetteer: 2002)

See also
 Shilahara

References
 Bhandarkar R.G. (1957): Early History of Deccan, Sushil Gupta (I) Pvt Ltd, Calcutta.
 Fleet J.F (1896) :The Dynasties of the Kanarese District of The Bombay Presidency, Written for the Bombay Gazetteer .
 Department of Gazetteer, Govt of Maharashtra (2002) : Itihaas : Prachin Kal, Khand -1 (Marathi)
 Department of Gazetteer, Govt of Maharashtra (1960) : Kolhapur District Gazetteer
 Department of Gazetteer, Govt of Maharashtra (1964) : Kolaba District Gazetteer
 Department of Gazetteer, Govt of Maharashtra (1982) : Thane District Gazetteer
 A.S.Altekar (1936) : The Silaharas of Western India

External links
  Silver Coin of Shilaharas of Southern Maharashtra (Coinex 2006 - Souvenir)

9th-century rulers in Asia
Shilahara dynasty